T. aprica may refer to:

Tarache aprica, a moth species
Townsendia aprica, a flowering plant species
Trypeta aprica, a fruit fly species